Beauty Will Rise is Steven Curtis Chapman's 15th studio album, released on November 3, 2009.

Background 
Many of the songs on the album are inspired by the accidental death of Chapman's youngest daughter, Maria Sue Chunxi Chapman. Extensive liner notes by Chapman describe how each song was related to the grieving process that he and his family went through after she died. The album was produced by Brent Milligan and initial recordings took place while Chapman was on tour in various locations such as hotel rooms, backstage dressing rooms, and theatre lobbies. "Beauty Will Rise" is dedicated to Maria Sue.

Singles 
The album's lead single, "Heaven Is the Face", was released to radio on August 21, 2009, peaking at No. 7 on Billboard's Hot Christian Songs chart.

Commercial performance
Up to December 25, 2009, the album has sold over 81,000 copies. The album debuted at No. 27 on the US Billboard 200 chart and No. 1 on the Top Christian Albums chart.

Track listing

Personnel 
 Steven Curtis Chapman – lead vocals, acoustic piano (1, 2, 3, 8, 9), acoustic guitar (1, 2, 4–7, 9-12), backing vocals (2, 5, 7, 9), snare drum (2), mandolin (4), percussion (4), electric guitar (5, 6), programming (10)
 Joe Causey – programming (1, 2, 5, 7, 12), electric guitar (1, 2, 6, 10), percussion (1), acoustic piano (6, 7, 12), trumpet (7), Rhodes (10)
 Brent Milligan – cello (1, 2, 4, 5, 10, 11, 12), baritone (1), acoustic piano (4, 10), bass (4, 5, 6, 10, 11), keyboards (5), percussion (5, 9, 10), pads (6), bass drum (12), cymbals (12)
 Ben Shive – celeste (2), dulcimer (2)
 Ken Lewis – percussion (1, 6), bass drum (1), ride cymbal (1), drums (2, 10)
 Will Franklin Chapman – drums (5, 10)
 Richie Biggs – bass drum (12), cymbals (12)
 David Davidson – violin (2), strings (3, 12)
 David Angell – strings (3, 12)
 Monisa Angell – strings (3, 12)
 John Catchings – strings (3, 12), cello (8)
 Blair Masters – string arrangements (3, 12)
 John Mark Painter – horns (12), horn arrangements (12)
 Scott Sheriff – backing vocals (5, 10)

Production 
 Steven Curtis Chapman – producer
 Brent Milligan – producer, tracking (7)
 Russ Long – tracking (2), piano tracking (3), mixing (3, 6-11)
 Jeff Pitzer – violin recording (2)
 Baeho "Bobby" Shin –  string engineer (3, 12)
 John Mark Painter – horn recording (12)
 Steve Dady – children choir recording (12)
 Konrad Snyder – tracking assistant (2)
 Taylor Grubbs – tracking assistant (3)
 Scott Velazco – tracking assistant (3)
 Richie Biggs – mixing (1, 4, 12)
 F. Reid Shippen – mixing (2)
 Buckley Miller – mix assistant (2)
 Joe Causey – editing (1-5, 7, 8, 12)
 Adam Ayan – mastering
 Jess Chambers – A&R administration
 Bert Sumner – packaging design 
 Dale Manning – packaging design, packaging photography 
 Austin Mann Photography – album cover design, China photography, China collage 
 Jim Houser – management
 Dan Raines – management

Charts

Peak positions

Certifications and sales

References 

Steven Curtis Chapman albums
2009 albums